The Décapole (Dekapolis or ) was an alliance formed in 1354 by ten Imperial cities of the Holy Roman Empire in the Alsace region to maintain their rights. It was disbanded in 1679.

In 1354 Emperor Charles IV of Luxembourg ratified the treaty uniting the towns of Haguenau, Colmar, Wissembourg, Turckheim, Obernai, Kaysersberg, Rosheim, Munster, Sélestat and Mulhouse. Hagenau became its capital while the Imperial city of Strasbourg, though venue of the league's diets, remained outside the alliance. The town of Seltz joined the league when it received immediate status in 1357, but had to leave it after its mediatization to the Electorate of the Palatinate in 1414.

The affiliation at first discontinued after Charles' death in 1378, it was, however, re-established in the next year. The ten cities joined the Upper Rhenish Circle in 1500. In 1515, Mulhouse pulled out of the alliance in order to associate with the Old Swiss Confederacy. It was replaced in 1521 by the city of Landau in northern Alsace.

The alliance was strongly shaken by the Thirty Years' War which ravaged the region, allowing Louis XIV of France to conquer the cities according to the 1648 Peace of Westphalia. The signing of the Treaties of Nijmegen in 1679 finally brought an end to the Décapole, when Alsace was annexed by France. Mulhouse remained an independent city and exclave of the Swiss Confederation until in 1798 it was annexed to the French First Republic. Landau together with the Palatinate was given to Bavaria after the 1815 Congress of Vienna.

See also
Lombard League
Hanseatic League
Swabian League
Lusatian League
Pentapolitana
Prussian Confederation

References

 
History of the Holy Roman Empire by location
1350s establishments in the Holy Roman Empire
1354 establishments in Europe
1679 disestablishments in the Holy Roman Empire